The 65th Brigade Engineer Battalion ("Bayonets") is a light maneuver support battalion of the United States Army. Throughout the years, the 65th Brigade Engineer Battalion (65th BEB) has undergone several reorganizations and has participated in World War II, the Korean War, the Vietnam War, Operation Iraqi Freedom, and Operation Enduring Freedom.

Consisting of two engineer companies, an intelligence company, a signal company, and a headquarters company, the 65th BEB is currently assigned to the 2nd Brigade Combat Team, 25th Infantry Division ("Warriors") based out of Schofield Barracks, Hawaii. They typically conduct operations within the Asia-Pacific region under the command of United States Pacific Command (USPACOM).

Mission 
65th BEB is capable of deploying scalable, combat multiplier capabilities within 72 hours to enable 2/25 IBCT during Unified Land Operations and support emerging requirements and contingencies that deter conflict within the USPACOM AOR.

History

Lineage 
The 65th Brigade Engineer Battalion was first constituted into the Regular Army as the 65th Engineer Battalion on 18 October 1927. The unit was inactive and remained inactive for 14 years. On 1 October 1941, the Hawaiian Division was split into the 24th and 25th Infantry divisions. The 65th Engineer Battalion was assigned to the 25th Infantry Division (25th ID), and was activated. Soon after, the Japanese launched their attack on Pearl Harbor, and the 65th was called to service during World War II. On 1 January 1944, the 65th was reorganized, designated as the 65th Engineer Combat Battalion. After the war, it deployed to Japan to assist in occupation duties for the next five years.

The battalion was then engaged in the Korean War during 1950–1954. In 1954, the unit finally returned home to Schofield Barracks after more than 12 years overseas. On 1 March 1954, the battalion was reorganized and once again designated as the 65th Engineer Battalion. In 1965, the battalion deployed to the Republic of Vietnam and did not redeploy home until 8 December 1970. On 15 August 2005, the unit laid down its colors, and was inactivated and reorganized as a Special Troops Battalion under the 3rd Brigade Combat Team.

The 65th was reactivated on 16 July 2007 and assigned to the 8th Military Police Brigade, 8th Theater Sustainment Command as a combat effects battalion. In June 2008, they were then assigned to the 130th Engineer Brigade, 8th Theater Sustainment Command. With the 130th, the unit deployed to Northern Iraq as well as Afghanistan. When they returned to Schofield Barracks, they were assigned to the 2nd Stryker Brigade Combat Team (2SBCT), 25th Infantry Division and designated as a brigade engineer battalion on 16 October 2014. In spring 2016, the 2nd Stryker Brigade Combat Team was relieved of its strykers and organized into its current status as a (light) infantry brigade combat team.

World War II 
The 65th Brigade Engineer Battalion's first mission was to improve defenses in Oahu. Their main areas of concern were the beaches and trails in the southern region. They first saw action on 7 December 1941 during the attack on Pearl Harbor. They were then swiftly deployed to Guadalcanal in the Solomon Islands to participate in the Guadalcanal Campaign.

The Japanese held strong defensive fortifications on Mount Austen as well as on two nearby ridges: Seahorse and Galloping Horse. Offensive operations to capture the three locations began on 7 January 1943. Despite the fact that the 65th Engineer Battalion was poorly equipped, they aided in the seizure of the key terrain by opening roads and maintaining lines of communication. They also opened up supply routes to the interior by dredging the Matanikau River allowing free movement for boats. In January 1943 XIV Corps went on the offensive. As XIV Corps moved into the Northern Solomons, New Georgia, Vella LaVella, Sasavele, and Kolombangara, the 65th Engineer Battalion continued to support freedom of maneuver and facilitate resupply routes by improving roads and trails and building bridges and fording sites.

On 11 January 1945, the 65th landed on Luzon in continued support of the 25th ID who was then assigned to the Sixth Army. The unit faced continuous fierce ground combat and was removed on 30 June 1945. At the end of WWII, the 65th Engineer Battalion received 4 campaign streamers: Central Pacific, Guadalcanal, Northern Solomons, and Luzon. Alpha, Bravo, and Charlie Companies each also earned a Presidential Unit Citation for Gallantry on Luzon. The 65th was then deployed to Japan with the 25th ID in order to assist in occupation duties.

Korean War 

In 1950, the 65th deployed straight from Japan to the Republic of Korea. During the Korean War, the unit conducted similar missions as they had in World War II. Their duties consisted of mine/booby trap clearing, obstacle reducing/building, road and trail improvements, and bridge building.

They assisted the 25th ID throughout the entirety of the war, participating in all ten campaigns: UN Defensive, UN Offensive, CCF Intervention, First UN Counteroffensive, CCF Spring Offensive, UN Summer-Fall Offensive, Second Korean Winter, Korea Summer-Fall 1952, Third Korean Winter, and Korea Summer 1953. In addition to the battalion receiving streamers for campaign participation, Alpha, Bravo, and Charlie Companies also received Presidential Unit Citations. Alpha Company received the award for assisting the 27th Infantry Regiment ("Wolfhounds") in defending the Pusan Perimeter. Bravo Company earned it while aiding the 35th Infantry Regiment in their stand at the Nam River. Charlie Company obtained the citation for supporting the 25th ID's combat operations near Taegu.

The battalion also received a Meritorious Unit Commendation and two Republic of Korea Presidential Unit Citations. By the time the 65th returned home to Schofield Barracks from participating in WWII and the Korean War, they had spent 800 days in direct support of combat operations and 12 years overseas.

Vietnam War and the post-Cold War era

The 65th was deployed to Vietnam in 1965 and spent six years supporting the 25th Infantry Division. One of the main assignments during the Vietnam War was jungle clearing operations near Cu Chi, Dau Tieng and Tay Ninh 25th Division basecamps. During this time it gained 12 campaign credits before returning to the United States in 1971, arriving at Oahu, Hawaii. Between 1972 and 1986 the unit served as a divisional engineer unit, before being converted into a light engineering battalion. In 2002, the battalion deployed 80 personnel to Bosnia in support of the 25th Infantry Division. After this, it was inactivated in 2005 as the 25th Infantry Division was reorganized along modular lines. The battalion was reactivated as part of the 130th Engineer Brigade in Hawaii in 2008. With this formation, the unit deployed to both Iraq and Afghanistan under Operation Iraqi Freedom and Operation Enduring Freedom.

Organization 
The unit consists of six companies: Headquarters & Headquarters Company ("Renegades"), Alpha Company ("Sappers"), Bravo Company ("Beast"), Charlie Company ("Charge"), Delta Company ("Daggers"), and Echo Company ("Phoenix").

References 

Engineer battalions of the United States Army
Military units and formations established in 1927